Oea or Oia or Oee or Oie (Οἴη) or Oe (Ὄη or Ὀή) was a deme of ancient Athens. 

The location of Oea has been a matter of debate, with some situating it above the Pythium, to the west of Mount Aegaleos, to the north of the pass of Poecilum, and recent work putting the site northeast of Aspropyrgos. 

In the Boule of 500, Oea held six seats, and the deme seems to have maintained this rough scale into the Roman period.

Notable citizens 
 Damonides, Athenian musicologist and advisor to Pericles
 Eratosthenes, famous adulterer in Lysias' first speech
 Lamachus, Athenian general, son of Xenophanes
 Tydeus, Athenian general, son of Lamachus

References

Populated places in ancient Attica
Former populated places in Greece
Demoi